The Lisbon Recognition Convention, officially the Convention on the Recognition of Qualifications concerning Higher Education in the European Region, is an international convention of the Council of Europe elaborated together with the UNESCO. This is the main legal agreement on credential evaluation in Europe.

As of 2012, the convention has been ratified by all 47 member states of the Council of Europe in Strasbourg except for Greece and Monaco. It has also been ratified by the Council of Europe non-member states Australia, Belarus, Canada, the Holy See, Israel, Kazakhstan, Kyrgyzstan, Tajikistan and New Zealand. The United States has signed but not ratified the convention.

Aims
The Convention stipulates that degrees and periods of study must be recognised unless substantial differences can be proved by the institution that is charged with recognition. Students and graduates are guaranteed fair procedures under the convention.
It is named after Lisbon, Portugal, where it was signed in 1997, and entered into force on 1 February 1999 (or later in some countries, subject to ratification date).

Convention bodies
The convention established two bodies which oversee, promote and facilitate the implementation of the convention:
 the Committee of the convention on the Recognition of Qualifications concerning Higher Education in the European Region, and
 the European Network of Information Centres on Academic Mobility and Recognition (the ENIC Network).

The committee is responsible for promoting the application of the convention and overseeing its implementation. To this end, it can adopt, by a majority of the Signatory Parties, recommendations, declarations, protocols and models of good practice to guide the competent authorities of the Parties. Before making its decisions, the Committee seeks the opinion of the ENIC Network. As for the ENIC Network, it upholds and assists the practical implementation of the convention by the competent national authorities.

Bologna Process
The Lisbon Recognition Convention is an important instrument for the Bologna Process which aims at creating the "European higher education area" by making academic degree standards and quality assurance standards more comparable and compatible throughout Europe.

Historical background
The possibility for students to study abroad has been recognised as an essential element of European integration since the foundation of the Council of Europe in 1949. Within the Council of Europe, several international treaties were elaborated in this field: starting with the right to education under Article 2 of the first Protocol of 1952 to the European Convention on Human Rights, the European Convention on the Equivalence of Diplomas leading to Admission to Universities was opened for signature in 1953, the European Convention on the Equivalence of Periods of University Study in 1956, the European Convention on the Academic Recognition of University Qualifications in 1959, the European Agreement on continued Payment of Scholarships to students studying abroad in 1969, and the European Convention on the General Equivalence of Periods of University Study in 1990.

In addition, under Article 2 of the Council of Europe's European Cultural Convention of 1954, each Contracting Party shall, insofar as may be possible: encourage the study by its own nationals of the languages, history and civilisation of the other Contracting Parties and grant facilities to those Parties to promote such studies in its territory; and endeavour to promote the study of its language or languages, history and civilisation in the territory of the other Contracting Parties and grant facilities to the nationals of those Parties to pursue such studies in its territory.

References
Lisbon Recognition Convention

External links
List of signatory states

Educational assessment and evaluation
Education treaties
Higher education accreditation
Academia in Europe
Council of Europe treaties
UNESCO treaties
Treaties concluded in 1997
Treaties entered into force in 1999
1997 in education
Treaties of Albania
Treaties of Andorra
Treaties of Armenia
Treaties of Austria
Treaties of Azerbaijan
Treaties of Belgium
Treaties of Bosnia and Herzegovina
Treaties of Bulgaria
Treaties of Canada
Treaties of Croatia
Treaties of Cyprus
Treaties of the Czech Republic
Treaties of Denmark
Treaties of Estonia
Treaties of Finland
Treaties of France
Treaties of Georgia (country)
Treaties of Germany
Treaties of Hungary
Treaties of Iceland
Treaties of Ireland
Treaties of Italy
Treaties of Latvia
Treaties of Liechtenstein
Treaties of Lithuania
Treaties of Luxembourg
Treaties of Malta
Treaties of Moldova
Treaties of Montenegro
Treaties of the Netherlands
Treaties of Norway
Treaties of Poland
Treaties of Portugal
Treaties of Romania
Treaties of Russia
Treaties of San Marino
Treaties of Serbia and Montenegro
Treaties of Slovakia
Treaties of Slovenia
Treaties of Spain
Treaties of Sweden
Treaties of Switzerland
Treaties of North Macedonia
Treaties of Turkey
Treaties of Ukraine
Treaties of the United Kingdom
Treaties of Australia
Treaties of Belarus
Treaties of the Holy See
Treaties of Israel
Treaties of Kazakhstan
Treaties of Kyrgyzstan
Treaties of New Zealand
Treaties of Tajikistan
1997 in Portugal
Treaties extended to Greenland
Treaties extended to the Faroe Islands
Treaties extended to the Caribbean Netherlands
Treaties extended to the Isle of Man